Elbow is a village in the Canadian province of Saskatchewan within the Rural Municipality of Loreburn No. 254 and Census Division No. 11. Elbow was founded in 1909, near what is now Lake Diefenbaker. It is 8 km northwest of Mistusinne, 10 km northwest of Douglas Provincial Park and 16 km southeast of Loreburn. The village got its name from its position on the elbow of the South Saskatchewan River.

The village contains a marina for boat storage and house boat rental, a golf course, a boat dealership and two restaurants. There is also a sod house (now a museum), and a library.

History 
Elbow incorporated as a village on April 6, 1909.

Demographics 

Climate

Elbow experiences a Humid continental climate (Dfb).

See also 
 List of communities in Saskatchewan
 Villages of Saskatchewan

References

Villages in Saskatchewan
Loreburn No. 254, Saskatchewan
Division No. 11, Saskatchewan